Janq'u Apachita (Aymara janq'u white, apachita the place of transit of an important pass in the principal routes of the Andes; name in the Andes for a stone cairn, a little pile of rocks built along the trail in the high mountains, also spelled Janko Apacheta, Jankho Apacheta)  is a  mountain in the southern part of the Chilla-Kimsa Chata mountain range in the Andes of Bolivia. It is located in the La Paz Department, Pacajes Province, Waldo Ballivián Municipality. Janq'u Apachita lies northeast of Wila Qullu.

References 

Mountains of La Paz Department (Bolivia)